St. Augustine Catholic Church (originally St Martin de Porres Catholic Church) is a Catholic parish in Washington, D.C. It is considered by many to be the "Mother Church of Black Catholics", as the first Black parish in the district and the administrator of DC's oldest Black school.

History 
Because of Jim Crow laws in the 1850s, emancipated black Catholic attendees of St. Matthew's Cathedral on Rhode Island Avenue were segregated and relegated to worship in the basement of the church.

In 1858, the group of emancipated black Catholics founded Saint Martin de Porres Church, in honor of Peruvian Dominican brother St Martin de Porres. It was the first Black Catholic parish in Washington D.C., and its original location was on 15th Street NW, near L Street.

That same year, the parish opened the first school for Black children in the district—inaugurated five years before the Emancipation Proclamation, after which education of Black children gradually became mandatory.

Saint Martin de Porres era

On July 4, 1864, their group raised building funds at the "strawberry festival" on the White House grounds, hosted by Abraham Lincoln and his wife Mary Todd Lincoln.

Saint Augustine era
In 1876, the church building was inaugurated and re-dedicated to Saint Augustine. It was a 60-foot building with two Gothic spires, and seating for 2,500 people. In 1928, it acquired property at 15th and S Streets N.W., where it eventually built a new school, rectory, convent, and new church building.

In 1946 the original church was sold, under circumstances which are debated, for $300,000, and operations shifted to the 15th and S property; the last Mass in its original building was held on Christmas Day. It was demolished the next year. The site became the location of the Washington Post newspaper, and remained the Post's home until 2016 when the site was sold to private developers.

Current church and building
In 1961 St. Augustine Church merged with St. Paul's Church, a parish whose original membership was primary of Irish and German descent, located at 15th and V Street. It was renamed to Sts. Paul and Augustine Church. In 1979, as St. Paul's continued to dwindle, the decision was made to consolidate operations on the old St. Paul campus, and that the 15th and S property would be sold. On November 12, 1982, Cardinal Hickey decreed that the parish would be renamed once again to Saint Augustine Catholic Church.

The parish did not have a Black pastor until January 1991, when Fr. Russell L. Dillard was installed. Today, the church has 3,000 members in an active congregation of approximately 1,000 families, primarily Black and middle-class.

The present building is made with crafted stone and also has two spires as the original building once had.

See also 
 Roman Catholic Archdiocese of Washington
 Dunbar High School (Washington, D.C.)
 Howard University

References

External links
 

Roman Catholic churches in Washington, D.C.
1858 establishments in Washington, D.C.
Religious organizations established in 1858
African-American Roman Catholic churches
Roman Catholic churches completed in 1876
19th-century Roman Catholic church buildings in the United States
Roman Catholic Archdiocese of Washington